Sponges, the members of the phylum Porifera (meaning 'pore bearer'), are a basal animal clade as a sister of the diploblasts. They are multicellular organisms that have bodies full of pores and channels allowing water to circulate through them, consisting of jelly-like mesohyl sandwiched between two thin layers of cells.

Sponges have unspecialized cells that can transform into other types and that often migrate between the main cell layers and the mesohyl in the process. Sponges do not have complex nervous, digestive or circulatory systems like humans. Instead, most rely on maintaining a constant water flow through their bodies to obtain food and oxygen and to remove wastes. Sponges were first to branch off the evolutionary tree from the last common ancestor of all animals, making them the sister group of all other animals.

Etymology 
The term sponge derives from the Ancient Greek word  ( 'sponge').

Overview 

Sponges are similar to other animals in that they are multicellular, heterotrophic, lack cell walls and produce sperm cells. Unlike other animals, they lack true tissues and organs. Some of them are radially symmetrical, but most are asymmetrical. The shapes of their bodies are adapted for maximal efficiency of water flow through the central cavity, where the water deposits nutrients and then leaves through a hole called the osculum. Many sponges have internal skeletons of spicules (skeletal-like fragments of calcium carbonate or silicon dioxide), and/or spongin (a modified type of collagen protein). All adult sponges are sessile aquatic animals, meaning that they attach to an underwater surface and remain fixed in place (i.e., do not travel) while in larval stage of life they are motile. Although there are freshwater species, the great majority are marine (salt-water) species, ranging in habitat from tidal zones to depths exceeding .

Although most of the approximately 5,000–10,000 known species of sponges feed on bacteria and other microscopic food in the water, some host photosynthesizing microorganisms as endosymbionts, and these alliances often produce more food and oxygen than they consume. A few species of sponges that live in food-poor environments have evolved as carnivores that prey mainly on small crustaceans.

Sponges reproduce both asexually and sexually. Most species that use sexual reproduction release sperm cells into the water to fertilize ova that in some species are released and in others are retained by the "mother". The fertilized eggs develop into larvae, which swim off in search of places to settle. Sponges are known for regenerating from fragments that are broken off, although this only works if the fragments include the right types of cells. Some species reproduce by budding. When environmental conditions become less hospitable to the sponges, for example as temperatures drop, many freshwater species and a few marine ones produce gemmules, "survival pods" of unspecialized cells that remain dormant until conditions improve; they then either form completely new sponges or recolonize the skeletons of their parents.

In most sponges, an internal gelatinous matrix called mesohyl functions as an endoskeleton, and it is the only skeleton in soft sponges that encrust such hard surfaces as rocks. More commonly, the mesohyl is stiffened by mineral spicules, by spongin fibers, or both. Demosponges use spongin; many species have silica spicules, whereas some species have calcium carbonate exoskeletons. Demosponges constitute about 90% of all known sponge species, including all freshwater ones, and they have the widest range of habitats. Calcareous sponges, which have calcium carbonate spicules and, in some species, calcium carbonate exoskeletons, are restricted to relatively shallow marine waters where production of calcium carbonate is easiest. The fragile glass sponges, with "scaffolding" of silica spicules, are restricted to polar regions and the ocean depths where predators are rare.

The single-celled choanoflagellates resemble the choanocyte cells of sponges which are used to drive their water flow systems and capture most of their food. This along with phylogenetic studies of ribosomal molecules have been used as morphological evidence to suggest sponges are the sister group to the rest of animals.

The few species of demosponge that have entirely soft fibrous skeletons with no hard elements have been used by humans over thousands of years for several purposes, including as padding and as cleaning tools. By the 1950s, though, these had been overfished so heavily that the industry almost collapsed, and most sponge-like materials are now synthetic. Sponges and their microscopic endosymbionts are now being researched as possible sources of medicines for treating a wide range of diseases. Dolphins have been observed using sponges as tools while foraging.

Distinguishing features 

Sponges constitute the phylum Porifera, and have been defined as sessile metazoans (multicelled immobile animals) that have water intake and outlet openings connected by chambers lined with choanocytes, cells with whip-like flagella. However, a few carnivorous sponges have lost these water flow systems and the choanocytes. All known living sponges can remold their bodies, as most types of their cells can move within their bodies and a few can change from one type to another.

Even if a few sponges are able to produce mucus – which acts as a microbial barrier in all other animals – no sponge with the ability to secrete a functional mucus layer has been recorded. Without such a mucus layer their living tissue is covered by a layer of microbial symbionts, which can contribute up to 40–50% of the sponge wet mass. This inability to prevent microbes from penetrating their porous tissue could be a major reason why they have never evolved a more complex anatomy.

Like cnidarians (jellyfish, etc.) and ctenophores (comb jellies), and unlike all other known metazoans, sponges' bodies consist of a non-living jelly-like mass (mesohyl) sandwiched between two main layers of cells. Cnidarians and ctenophores have simple nervous systems, and their cell layers are bound by internal connections and by being mounted on a basement membrane (thin fibrous mat, also known as "basal lamina"). Sponges do not have a nervous systems similar to that of vertebrates but may have one that is quite different. Their middle jelly-like layers have large and varied populations of cells, and some types of cells in their outer layers may move into the middle layer and change their functions.

Basic structure

Cell types 

A sponge's body is hollow and is held in shape by the mesohyl, a jelly-like substance made mainly of collagen and reinforced by a dense network of fibers also made of collagen. The inner surface is covered with choanocytes, cells with cylindrical or conical collars surrounding one flagellum per choanocyte. The wave-like motion of the whip-like flagella drives water through the sponge's body. All sponges have ostia, channels leading to the interior through the mesohyl, and in most sponges these are controlled by tube-like porocytes that form closable inlet valves. Pinacocytes, plate-like cells, form a single-layered external skin over all other parts of the mesohyl that are not covered by choanocytes, and the pinacocytes also digest food particles that are too large to enter the ostia, while those at the base of the animal are responsible for anchoring it.

Other types of cell live and move within the mesohyl:
 Lophocytes are amoeba-like cells that move slowly through the mesohyl and secrete collagen fibres.
 Collencytes are another type of collagen-producing cell.
 Rhabdiferous cells secrete polysaccharides that also form part of the mesohyl.
 Oocytes and spermatocytes are reproductive cells.
 Sclerocytes secrete the mineralized spicules ("little spines") that form the skeletons of many sponges and in some species provide some defense against predators.
 In addition to or instead of sclerocytes, demosponges have spongocytes that secrete a form of collagen that polymerizes into spongin, a thick fibrous material that stiffens the mesohyl.
 Myocytes ("muscle cells") conduct signals and cause parts of the animal to contract.
 "Grey cells" act as sponges' equivalent of an immune system.
 Archaeocytes (or amoebocytes) are amoeba-like cells that are totipotent, in other words each is capable of transformation into any other type of cell. They also have important roles in feeding and in clearing debris that block the ostia.

Many larval sponges possess neuron-less eyes that are based on cryptochromes. They mediate phototaxic behavior.

Glass sponges' syncytia 

Glass sponges present a distinctive variation on this basic plan. Their spicules, which are made of silica, form a scaffolding-like framework between whose rods the living tissue is suspended like a cobweb that contains most of the cell types. This tissue is a syncytium that in some ways behaves like many cells that share a single external membrane, and in others like a single cell with multiple nuclei. The mesohyl is absent or minimal. The syncytium's cytoplasm, the soupy fluid that fills the interiors of cells, is organized into "rivers" that transport nuclei, organelles ("organs" within cells) and other substances. Instead of choanocytes, they have further syncytia, known as choanosyncytia, which form bell-shaped chambers where water enters via perforations. The insides of these chambers are lined with "collar bodies", each consisting of a collar and flagellum but without a nucleus of its own. The motion of the flagella sucks water through passages in the "cobweb" and expels it via the open ends of the bell-shaped chambers.

Some types of cells have a single nucleus and membrane each, but are connected to other single-nucleus cells and to the main syncytium by "bridges" made of cytoplasm. The sclerocytes that build spicules have multiple nuclei, and in glass sponge larvae they are connected to other tissues by cytoplasm bridges; such connections between sclerocytes have not so far been found in adults, but this may simply reflect the difficulty of investigating such small-scale features. The bridges are controlled by "plugged junctions" that apparently permit some substances to pass while blocking others.

Water flow and body structures 

Most sponges work rather like chimneys: they take in water at the bottom and eject it from the osculum ("little mouth") at the top. Since ambient currents are faster at the top, the suction effect that they produce by Bernoulli's principle does some of the work for free. Sponges can control the water flow by various combinations of wholly or partially closing the osculum and ostia (the intake pores) and varying the beat of the flagella, and may shut it down if there is a lot of sand or silt in the water.

Although the layers of pinacocytes and choanocytes resemble the epithelia of more complex animals, they are not bound tightly by cell-to-cell connections or a basal lamina (thin fibrous sheet underneath). The flexibility of these layers and re-modeling of the mesohyl by lophocytes allow the animals to adjust their shapes throughout their lives to take maximum advantage of local water currents.

The simplest body structure in sponges is a tube or vase shape known as "asconoid", but this severely limits the size of the animal. The body structure is characterized by a stalk-like spongocoel surrounded by a single layer of choanocytes. If it is simply scaled up, the ratio of its volume to surface area increases, because surface increases as the square of length or width while volume increases proportionally to the cube. The amount of tissue that needs food and oxygen is determined by the volume, but the pumping capacity that supplies food and oxygen depends on the area covered by choanocytes. Asconoid sponges seldom exceed  in diameter.

Some sponges overcome this limitation by adopting the "syconoid" structure, in which the body wall is pleated. The inner pockets of the pleats are lined with choanocytes, which connect to the outer pockets of the pleats by ostia. This increase in the number of choanocytes and hence in pumping capacity enables syconoid sponges to grow up to a few centimeters in diameter.

The "leuconoid" pattern boosts pumping capacity further by filling the interior almost completely with mesohyl that contains a network of chambers lined with choanocytes and connected to each other and to the water intakes and outlet by tubes. All freshwater and most shallow-water marine sponges have leuconid bodies. The networks of water passages in glass sponges are similar to the leuconid structure.
In all three types of structure the cross-section area of the choanocyte-lined regions is much greater than that of the intake and outlet channels. This makes the flow slower near the choanocytes and thus makes it easier for them to trap food particles. However, because Leuconia has more than 2 million flagellated chambers whose combined diameter is much greater than that of the canals, water flow through chambers slows to 3.6 cm per hour, making it easy for choanocytes to capture food. All the water is expelled through a single osculum at about 8.5 cm per second, fast enough to carry waste products some distance away.

Skeleton 
In zoology a skeleton is any fairly rigid structure of an animal, irrespective of whether it has joints and irrespective of whether it is biomineralized. The mesohyl functions as an endoskeleton in most sponges, and is the only skeleton in soft sponges that encrust hard surfaces such as rocks. More commonly the mesohyl is stiffened by mineral spicules, by spongin fibers or both. Spicules, which are present in most but not all species, may be made of silica or calcium carbonate, and vary in shape from simple rods to three-dimensional "stars" with up to six rays. Spicules are produced by sclerocyte cells, and may be separate, connected by joints, or fused.

Some sponges also secrete exoskeletons that lie completely outside their organic components. For example, sclerosponges ("hard sponges") have massive calcium carbonate exoskeletons over which the organic matter forms a thin layer with choanocyte chambers in pits in the mineral. These exoskeletons are secreted by the pinacocytes that form the animals' skins.

Vital functions

Movement 
A few species can contract their whole bodies, and many can close their oscula and ostia. Juveniles drift or swim freely, while adults are stationary.

Respiration, feeding and excretion 

Sponges do not have distinct circulatory, respiratory, digestive, and excretory systems – instead the water flow system supports all these functions. They filter food particles out of the water flowing through them. Particles larger than 50 micrometers cannot enter the ostia and pinacocytes consume them by phagocytosis (engulfing and intracellular digestion). Particles from 0.5 μm to 50 μm are trapped in the ostia, which taper from the outer to inner ends. These particles are consumed by pinacocytes or by archaeocytes which partially extrude themselves through the walls of the ostia. Bacteria-sized particles, below 0.5 micrometers, pass through the ostia and are caught and consumed by choanocytes. Since the smallest particles are by far the most common, choanocytes typically capture 80% of a sponge's food supply. Archaeocytes transport food packaged in vesicles from cells that directly digest food to those that do not. At least one species of sponge has internal fibers that function as tracks for use by nutrient-carrying archaeocytes, and these tracks also move inert objects.

It used to be claimed that glass sponges could live on nutrients dissolved in sea water and were very averse to silt. However, a study in 2007 found no evidence of this and concluded that they extract bacteria and other micro-organisms from water very efficiently (about 79%) and process suspended sediment grains to extract such prey. Collar bodies digest food and distribute it wrapped in vesicles that are transported by dynein "motor" molecules along bundles of microtubules that run throughout the syncytium.

Sponges' cells absorb oxygen by diffusion from water into cells as water flows through body, into which carbon dioxide and other soluble waste products such as ammonia also diffuse. Archeocytes remove mineral particles that threaten to block the ostia, transport them through the mesohyl and generally dump them into the outgoing water current, although some species incorporate them into their skeletons.

Carnivorous sponges 

In waters where the supply of food particles is very poor, some species prey on crustaceans and other small animals. So far only 137 species have been discovered. Most belong to the family Cladorhizidae, but a few members of the Guitarridae and Esperiopsidae are also carnivores. In most cases little is known about how they actually capture prey, although some species are thought to use either sticky threads or hooked spicules.

Most known carnivorous sponges have completely lost the water flow system and choanocytes. However, the genus Chondrocladia uses a highly modified water flow system to inflate balloon-like structures that are used for capturing prey.

Endosymbionts 
Freshwater sponges often host green algae as endosymbionts within archaeocytes and other cells, and benefit from nutrients produced by the algae. Many marine species host other photosynthesizing organisms, most commonly cyanobacteria but in some cases dinoflagellates. Symbiotic cyanobacteria may form a third of the total mass of living tissue in some sponges, and some sponges gain 48% to 80% of their energy supply from these micro-organisms. In 2008 a University of Stuttgart team reported that spicules made of silica conduct light into the mesohyl, where the photosynthesizing endosymbionts live. Sponges that host photosynthesizing organisms are most common in waters with relatively poor supplies of food particles, and often have leafy shapes that maximize the amount of sunlight they collect.

A recently discovered carnivorous sponge that lives near hydrothermal vents hosts methane-eating bacteria, and digests some of them.

"Immune" system 
Sponges do not have the complex immune systems of most other animals. However, they reject grafts from other species but accept them from other members of their own species. In a few marine species, gray cells play the leading role in rejection of foreign material. When invaded, they produce a chemical that stops movement of other cells in the affected area, thus preventing the intruder from using the sponge's internal transport systems. If the intrusion persists, the grey cells concentrate in the area and release toxins that kill all cells in the area. The "immune" system can stay in this activated state for up to three weeks.

Reproduction

Asexual 

Sponges have three asexual methods of reproduction: after fragmentation, by budding, and by producing gemmules. Fragments of sponges may be detached by currents or waves. They use the mobility of their pinacocytes and choanocytes and reshaping of the mesohyl to re-attach themselves to a suitable surface and then rebuild themselves as small but functional sponges over the course of several days. The same capabilities enable sponges that have been squeezed through a fine cloth to regenerate. A sponge fragment can only regenerate if it contains both collencytes to produce mesohyl and archeocytes to produce all the other cell types. A very few species reproduce by budding.

Gemmules are "survival pods" which a few marine sponges and many freshwater species produce by the thousands when dying and which some, mainly freshwater species, regularly produce in autumn. Spongocytes make gemmules by wrapping shells of spongin, often reinforced with spicules, round clusters of archeocytes that are full of nutrients. Freshwater gemmules may also include photosynthesizing symbionts. The gemmules then become dormant, and in this state can survive cold, drying out, lack of oxygen and extreme variations in salinity. Freshwater gemmules often do not revive until the temperature drops, stays cold for a few months and then reaches a near-"normal" level. When a gemmule germinates, the archeocytes round the outside of the cluster transform into pinacocytes, a membrane over a pore in the shell bursts, the cluster of cells slowly emerges, and most of the remaining archeocytes transform into other cell types needed to make a functioning sponge. Gemmules from the same species but different individuals can join forces to form one sponge. Some gemmules are retained within the parent sponge, and in spring it can be difficult to tell whether an old sponge has revived or been "recolonized" by its own gemmules.

Sexual 
Most sponges are hermaphrodites (function as both sexes simultaneously), although sponges have no gonads (reproductive organs). Sperm are produced by choanocytes or entire choanocyte chambers that sink into the mesohyl and form spermatic cysts while eggs are formed by transformation of archeocytes, or of choanocytes in some species. Each egg generally acquires a yolk by consuming "nurse cells". During spawning, sperm burst out of their cysts and are expelled via the osculum. If they contact another sponge of the same species, the water flow carries them to choanocytes that engulf them but, instead of digesting them, metamorphose to an ameboid form and carry the sperm through the mesohyl to eggs, which in most cases engulf the carrier and its cargo.

A few species release fertilized eggs into the water, but most retain the eggs until they hatch. There are four types of larvae, but all are balls of cells with an outer layer of cells whose flagellae or cilia enable the larvae to move. After swimming for a few days the larvae sink and crawl until they find a place to settle. Most of the cells transform into archeocytes and then into the types appropriate for their locations in a miniature adult sponge.

Glass sponge embryos start by dividing into separate cells, but once 32 cells have formed they rapidly transform into larvae that externally are ovoid with a band of cilia round the middle that they use for movement, but internally have the typical glass sponge structure of spicules with a cobweb-like main syncitium draped around and between them and choanosyncytia with multiple collar bodies in the center. The larvae then leave their parents' bodies.

Life cycle 
Sponges in temperate regions live for at most a few years, but some tropical species and perhaps some deep-ocean ones may live for 200 years or more. Some sponges start sexual reproduction when only a few weeks old, while others wait until they are several years old.

Coordination of activities 
Adult sponges lack neurons or any other kind of nervous tissue. However, most species have the ability to perform movements that are coordinated all over their bodies, mainly contractions of the pinacocytes, squeezing the water channels and thus expelling excess sediment and other substances that may cause blockages. Some species can contract the osculum independently of the rest of the body. Sponges may also contract in order to reduce the area that is vulnerable to attack by predators. In cases where two sponges are fused, for example if there is a large but still unseparated bud, these contraction waves slowly become coordinated in both of the "Siamese twins". The coordinating mechanism is unknown, but may involve chemicals similar to neurotransmitters. However, glass sponges rapidly transmit electrical impulses through all parts of the syncytium, and use this to halt the motion of their flagella if the incoming water contains toxins or excessive sediment. Myocytes are thought to be responsible for closing the osculum and for transmitting signals between different parts of the body.

Sponges contain genes very similar to those that contain the "recipe" for the post-synaptic density, an important signal-receiving structure in the neurons of all other animals. However, in sponges these genes are only activated in "flask cells" that appear only in larvae and may provide some sensory capability while the larvae are swimming. This raises questions about whether flask cells represent the predecessors of true neurons or are evidence that sponges' ancestors had true neurons but lost them as they adapted to a sessile lifestyle.

Ecology

Habitats 

Sponges are worldwide in their distribution, living in a wide range of ocean habitats, from the polar regions to the tropics. Most live in quiet, clear waters, because sediment stirred up by waves or currents would block their pores, making it difficult for them to feed and breathe. The greatest numbers of sponges are usually found on firm surfaces such as rocks, but some sponges can attach themselves to soft sediment by means of a root-like base.

Sponges are more abundant but less diverse in temperate waters than in tropical waters, possibly because organisms that prey on sponges are more abundant in tropical waters. Glass sponges are the most common in polar waters and in the depths of temperate and tropical seas, as their very porous construction enables them to extract food from these resource-poor waters with the minimum of effort. Demosponges and calcareous sponges are abundant and diverse in shallower non-polar waters.

The different classes of sponge live in different ranges of habitat:

{| class="wikitable"
|-
! Class !! Water type !! Depth !! Type of surface
|-
! Calcarea
| Marine || less than  || Hard
|-
! Glass sponges
| Marine || Deep || Soft or firm sediment
|-
! Demosponges
| Marine, brackish; and about 150 freshwater species || Inter-tidal to abyssal; a carnivorous demosponge has been found at  || Any
|}

As primary producers 
Sponges with photosynthesizing endosymbionts produce up to three times more oxygen than they consume, as well as more organic matter than they consume. Such contributions to their habitats' resources are significant along Australia's Great Barrier Reef but relatively minor in the Caribbean.

Defenses 

Many sponges shed spicules, forming a dense carpet several meters deep that keeps away echinoderms which would otherwise prey on the sponges. They also produce toxins that prevent other sessile organisms such as bryozoans or sea squirts from growing on or near them, making sponges very effective competitors for living space. One of many examples includes ageliferin.

A few species, the Caribbean fire sponge Tedania ignis, cause a severe rash in humans who handle them. Turtles and some fish feed mainly on sponges. It is often said that sponges produce chemical defenses against such predators. However, experiments have been unable to establish a relationship between the toxicity of chemicals produced by sponges and how they taste to fish, which would diminish the usefulness of chemical defenses as deterrents. Predation by fish may even help to spread sponges by detaching fragments. However, some studies have shown fish showing a preference for non chemically defended sponges, and another study found that high levels of coral predation did predict the presence of chemically defended species.

Glass sponges produce no toxic chemicals, and live in very deep water where predators are rare.

Predation 

Sponge flies, also known as spongilla-flies (Neuroptera, Sisyridae), are specialist predators of freshwater sponges. The female lays her eggs on vegetation overhanging water. The larvae hatch and drop into the water where they seek out sponges to feed on. They use their elongated mouthparts to pierce the sponge and suck the fluids within. The larvae of some species cling to the surface of the sponge while others take refuge in the sponge's internal cavities. The fully grown larvae leave the water and spin a cocoon in which to pupate.

Bioerosion 
The Caribbean chicken-liver sponge Chondrilla nucula secretes toxins that kill coral polyps, allowing the sponges to grow over the coral skeletons. Others, especially in the family Clionaidae, use corrosive substances secreted by their archeocytes to tunnel into rocks, corals and the shells of dead mollusks.

Diseases 
Caribbean sponges of the genus Aplysina suffer from Aplysina red band syndrome. This causes Aplysina to develop one or more rust-colored bands, sometimes with adjacent bands of necrotic tissue. These lesions may completely encircle branches of the sponge. The disease appears to be contagious and impacts approximately 10 percent of A. cauliformis on Bahamian reefs. The rust-colored bands are caused by a cyanobacterium, but it is unknown whether this organism actually causes the disease.

Collaboration with other organisms 
In addition to hosting photosynthesizing endosymbionts, sponges are noted for their wide range of collaborations with other organisms. The relatively large encrusting sponge Lissodendoryx colombiensis is most common on rocky surfaces, but has extended its range into seagrass meadows by letting itself be surrounded or overgrown by seagrass sponges, which are distasteful to the local starfish and therefore protect Lissodendoryx against them; in return the seagrass sponges get higher positions away from the sea-floor sediment.

Shrimps of the genus Synalpheus form colonies in sponges, and each shrimp species inhabits a different sponge species, making Synalpheus one of the most diverse crustacean genera. Specifically, Synalpheus regalis utilizes the sponge not only as a food source, but also as a defense against other shrimp and predators. As many as 16,000 individuals inhabit a single loggerhead sponge, feeding off the larger particles that collect on the sponge as it filters the ocean to feed itself. Other crustaceans such as hermit crabs commonly have a specific species of sponge, Pseudospongosorites, grow on them as both the sponge and crab occupy gastropod shells until the crab and sponge outgrow the shell, eventually resulting in the crab using the sponge's body as protection instead of the shell until the crab finds a suitable replacement shell.

Sponge loop 
Most sponges are detritivores which filter organic debris particles and microscopic life forms from ocean water. In particular, sponges occupy an important role as detritivores in coral reef food webs by recycling detritus to higher trophic levels.

The hypothesis has been made that coral reef sponges facilitate the transfer of coral-derived organic matter to their associated detritivores via the production of sponge detritus, as shown in the diagram. Several sponge species are able to convert coral-derived DOM into sponge detritus, and transfer organic matter produced by corals further up the reef food web. Corals release organic matter as both dissolved and particulate mucus, as well as cellular material such as expelled Symbiodinium.

Organic matter could be transferred from corals to sponges by all these pathways, but DOM likely makes up the largest fraction, as the majority (56 to 80%) of coral mucus dissolves in the water column, and coral loss of fixed carbon due to expulsion of Symbiodinium is typically negligible (0.01%) compared with mucus release (up to ~40%). Coral-derived organic matter could also be indirectly transferred to sponges via bacteria, which can also consume coral mucus.

Sponge holobiont 
Besides a one to one symbiotic relationship, it is possible for a host to become symbiotic with a microbial consortium.  Sponges are able to host a wide range of microbial communities that can also be very specific.  The microbial communities that form a symbiotic relationship with the sponge can amount to as much as 35% of the biomass of its host.  The term for this specific symbiotic relationship, where a microbial consortia pairs with a host is called a holobiotic relationship.  The sponge as well as the microbial community associated with it will produce a large range of secondary metabolites that help protect it against predators through mechanisms such as chemical defense.

Some of these relationships include endosymbionts within bacteriocyte cells, and cyanobacteria or microalgae found below the pinacoderm cell layer where they are able to receive the highest amount of light, used for phototrophy.  They can host over 50 different microbial phyla and candidate phyla, including Alphaprotoebacteria, Actinomycetota, Chloroflexota, Nitrospirota, "Cyanobacteria", the taxa Gamma-, the candidate phylum Poribacteria, and Thaumarchaea.

Systematics and evolutionary history

Taxonomy 

Linnaeus, who classified most kinds of sessile animals as belonging to the order Zoophyta in the class Vermes, mistakenly identified the genus Spongia as plants in the order Algae. For a long time thereafter sponges were assigned to a separate subkingdom, Parazoa ("beside the animals"), separate from the Eumetazoa which formed the rest of the kingdom Animalia. They have been regarded as a paraphyletic phylum, from which the higher animals have evolved. Other research indicates Porifera is monophyletic.

The phylum Porifera is further divided into classes mainly according to the composition of their skeletons:
 Hexactinellida (glass sponges) have silicate spicules, the largest of which have six rays and may be individual or fused. The main components of their bodies are syncytia in which large numbers of cell share a single external membrane.
 Calcarea have skeletons made of calcite, a form of calcium carbonate, which may form separate spicules or large masses. All the cells have a single nucleus and membrane.
 Most Demospongiae have silicate spicules or spongin fibers or both within their soft tissues. However, a few also have massive external skeletons made of aragonite, another form of calcium carbonate. All the cells have a single nucleus and membrane.
 Archeocyatha are known only as fossils from the Cambrian period.

In the 1970s, sponges with massive calcium carbonate skeletons were assigned to a separate class, Sclerospongiae, otherwise known as "coralline sponges".
However, in the 1980s it was found that these were all members of either the Calcarea or the Demospongiae.

So far scientific publications have identified about 9,000 poriferan species, of which: about 400 are glass sponges; about 500 are calcareous species; and the rest are demosponges. However, some types of habitat, vertical rock and cave walls and galleries in rock and coral boulders, have been investigated very little, even in shallow seas.

Classes 
Sponges were traditionally distributed in three classes: calcareous sponges (Calcarea), glass sponges (Hexactinellida) and demosponges (Demospongiae). However, studies have shown that the Homoscleromorpha, a group thought to belong to the Demospongiae, is actually phylogenetically well separated. Therefore, they have recently been recognized as the fourth class of sponges.

Sponges are divided into classes mainly according to the composition of their skeletons: These are arranged in evolutionary order as shown below in ascending order of their evolution from top to bottom:
{| class="wikitable"
! Class !! Type of cells !! Spicules !! Spongin fibers !! Massive exoskeleton !! Body form
|-
! Hexactinellida
| Mostly syncytia in all species|| SilicaMay be individual or fused || Never || Never || Leuconoid
|-
! Demospongiae
| Single nucleus, single external membrane || Silica || In many species || In some species.Made of aragonite if present.|| Leuconoid
|-
! Calcarea
| Single nucleus, single external membrane|| CalciteMay be individual or large masses || Never || Common.Made of calcite if present.|| Asconoid, syconoid, leuconoid or solenoid
|-
! Homoscleromorpha
| Single nucleus, single external membrane|| Silica || In many species || Never || Sylleibid or leuconoid
|}

Fossil record 

Although molecular clocks and biomarkers suggest sponges existed well before the Cambrian explosion of life, silica spicules like those of demosponges are absent from the fossil record until the Cambrian. These fossils, which include: spicules; pinacocytes; porocytes; archeocytes; sclerocytes; and the internal cavity, have been classified as demosponges. Early Cambrian sponges from Mexico belonging to the genus Kiwetinokia show evidence of fusion of several smaller spicules to form a single large spicule. Fossils found in the Canadian Northwest Territories dating to  may be sponges; if this finding is confirmed, it suggests the first animals appeared before the Neoproterozoic oxygenation event.

Although about 90% of modern sponges are demosponges, fossilized remains of this type are less common than those of other types because their skeletons are composed of relatively soft spongin that does not fossilize well.
Earliest sponge symbionts are known from the early Silurian.

A chemical tracer is 24-isopropylcholestane, which is a stable derivative of 24-isopropylcholesterol, which is said to be produced by demosponges but not by eumetazoans ("true animals", i.e. cnidarians and bilaterians). Since choanoflagellates are thought to be animals' closest single-celled relatives, a team of scientists examined the biochemistry and genes of one choanoflagellate species. They concluded that this species could not produce 24-isopropylcholesterol but that investigation of a wider range of choanoflagellates would be necessary in order to prove that the fossil 24-isopropylcholestane could only have been produced by demosponges.
While it has been argued that this 'sponge biomarker' could have originated from marine algae, recent research suggests that the algae's ability to produce this biomarker evolved only in the Carboniferous; as such, the biomarker remains strongly supportive of the presence of demosponges in the Cryogenian.

It has been suggested that they were produced by: sponges; cnidarians; algae; foraminiferans; a completely separate phylum of animals, Archaeocyatha; or even a completely separate kingdom of life, labeled Archaeata or Inferibionta. Since the 1990s archaeocyathids have been regarded as a distinctive group of sponges.

It is difficult to fit chancelloriids into classifications of sponges or more complex animals. An analysis in 1996 concluded that they were closely related to sponges on the grounds that the detailed structure of chancellorid sclerites ("armor plates") is similar to that of fibers of spongin, a collagen protein, in modern keratose (horny) demosponges such as Darwinella. However, another analysis in 2002 concluded that chancelloriids are not sponges and may be intermediate between sponges and more complex animals, among other reasons because their skins were thicker and more tightly connected than those of sponges. In 2008 a detailed analysis of chancelloriids' sclerites concluded that they were very similar to those of halkieriids, mobile bilaterian animals that looked like slugs in chain mail and whose fossils are found in rocks from the very Early Cambrian to the Mid Cambrian. If this is correct, it would create a dilemma, as it is extremely unlikely that totally unrelated organisms could have developed such similar sclerites independently, but the huge difference in the structures of their bodies makes it hard to see how they could be closely related.

Relationships to other animal groups 

In the 1990s sponges were widely regarded as a monophyletic group, all of them having descended from a common ancestor that was itself a sponge, and as the "sister-group" to all other metazoans (multi-celled animals), which themselves form a monophyletic group. On the other hand, some 1990s analyses also revived the idea that animals' nearest evolutionary relatives are choanoflagellates, single-celled organisms very similar to sponges' choanocytes – which would imply that most Metazoa evolved from very sponge-like ancestors and therefore that sponges may not be monophyletic, as the same sponge-like ancestors may have given rise both to modern sponges and to non-sponge members of Metazoa.

Analyses since 2001 have concluded that Eumetazoa (more complex than sponges) are more closely related to particular groups of sponges than to other sponge groups. Such conclusions imply that sponges are not monophyletic, because the last common ancestor of all sponges would also be a direct ancestor of the Eumetazoa, which are not sponges. A study in 2001 based on comparisons of ribosome DNA concluded that the most fundamental division within sponges was between glass sponges and the rest, and that Eumetazoa are more closely related to calcareous sponges (those with calcium carbonate spicules) than to other types of sponge. In 2007 one analysis based on comparisons of RNA and another based mainly on comparison of spicules concluded that demosponges and glass sponges are more closely related to each other than either is to the calcareous sponges, which in turn are more closely related to Eumetazoa.

Other anatomical and biochemical evidence links the Eumetazoa with Homoscleromorpha, a sub-group of demosponges. A comparison in 2007 of nuclear DNA, excluding glass sponges and comb jellies, concluded that:
 Homoscleromorpha are most closely related to Eumetazoa;
 calcareous sponges are the next closest;
 the other demosponges are evolutionary "aunts" of these groups; and
 the chancelloriids, bag-like animals whose fossils are found in Cambrian rocks, may be sponges.
The sperm of Homoscleromorpha share features with the sperm of Eumetazoa, that sperm of other sponges lack. In both Homoscleromorpha and Eumetazoa layers of cells are bound together by attachment to a carpet-like basal membrane composed mainly of "typ IV" collagen, a form of collagen not found in other sponges – although the spongin fibers that reinforce the mesohyl of all demosponges is similar to "type IV" collagen.

The analyses described above concluded that sponges are closest to the ancestors of all Metazoa, of all multi-celled animals including both sponges and more complex groups. However, another comparison in 2008 of 150 genes in each of 21 genera, ranging from fungi to humans but including only two species of sponge, suggested that comb jellies (ctenophora) are the most basal lineage of the Metazoa included in the sample. If this is correct, either modern comb jellies developed their complex structures independently of other Metazoa, or sponges' ancestors were more complex and all known sponges are drastically simplified forms. The study recommended further analyses using a wider range of sponges and other simple Metazoa such as Placozoa.

However reanalysis of the data showed that the computer algorithms used for analysis were misled by the presence of specific ctenophore genes that were markedly different from those of other species, leaving sponges as either the sister group to all other animals, or an ancestral paraphyletic grade. 'Family trees' constructed using a combination of all available data – morphological, developmental and molecular – concluded that the sponges are in fact a monophyletic group, and with the cnidarians form the sister group to the bilaterians.

A very large and internally consistent alignment of 1,719 proteins at the metazoan scale, published in 2017, showed that (i) sponges – represented by Homoscleromorpha, Calcarea, Hexactinellida, and Demospongiae – are monophyletic, (ii) sponges are sister-group to all other multicellular animals, (iii) ctenophores emerge as the second-earliest branching animal lineage, and (iv) placozoans emerge as the third animal lineage, followed by cnidarians sister-group to bilaterians.

In March 2021, scientists from Dublin found additional evidence that sponges are the sister group to all other animals.

Notable spongiologists 

 Céline Allewaert
 Patricia Bergquist
 James Scott Bowerbank
 Maurice Burton
 Henry John Carter
 Max Walker de Laubenfels
 Arthur Dendy
 Édouard Placide Duchassaing de Fontbressin
 Randolph Kirkpatrick
 Robert J. Lendlmayer von Lendenfeld
 Edward Alfred Minchin
 Giovanni Domenico Nardo
 Eduard Oscar Schmidt
 Émile Topsent

Use

By dolphins 
A report in 1997 described use of sponges  as a tool by bottlenose dolphins in Shark Bay in Western Australia. A dolphin will attach a marine sponge to its rostrum, which is presumably then used to protect it when searching for food in the sandy sea bottom. The behavior, known as sponging, has only been observed in this bay, and is almost exclusively shown by females. A study in 2005 concluded that mothers teach the behavior to their daughters, and that all the sponge-users are closely related, suggesting that it is a fairly recent innovation.

By humans

Skeleton 

The calcium carbonate or silica spicules of most sponge genera make them too rough for most uses, but two genera, Hippospongia and Spongia, have soft, entirely fibrous skeletons. Early Europeans used soft sponges for many purposes, including padding for helmets, portable drinking utensils and municipal water filters. Until the invention of synthetic sponges, they were used as cleaning tools, applicators for paints and ceramic glazes and discreet contraceptives. However, by the mid-20th century, over-fishing brought both the animals and the industry close to extinction.

Many objects with sponge-like textures are now made of substances not derived from poriferans. Synthetic sponges include personal and household cleaning tools, breast implants, and contraceptive sponges. Typical materials used are cellulose foam, polyurethane foam, and less frequently, silicone foam.

The luffa "sponge", also spelled loofah, which is commonly sold for use in the kitchen or the shower, is not derived from an animal but mainly from the fibrous "skeleton" of the sponge gourd (Luffa aegyptiaca, Cucurbitaceae).

Antibiotic compounds 
Sponges have medicinal potential due to the presence in sponges themselves or their microbial symbionts of chemicals that may be used to control viruses, bacteria, tumors and fungi.

Other biologically active compounds 

Lacking any protective shell or means of escape, sponges have evolved to synthesize a variety of unusual compounds. One such class is the oxidized fatty acid derivatives called oxylipins. Members of this family have been found to have anti-cancer, anti-bacterial and anti-fungal properties. One example isolated from the Okinawan plakortis sponges, plakoridine A, has shown potential as a cytotoxin to murine lymphoma cells.

See also 

 Lists of sponges
 Sponge Reef Project
 SpongeBob SquarePants
 3-Alkylpyridinium, compounds found in marine Haplosclerida sponges

References

Bibliography

External links 

 Water flow and feeding in the phylum Porifera (sponges) – Flash animations of sponge body structures, water flow and feeding
 Carsten's Spongepage, Information on the ecology and the biotechnological potential of sponges and their associated bacteria.
 History of Tarpon Springs sponge industry, Tarpon Springs, Florida
 Nature's 'fibre optics' experts
 The Sponge Reef Project
 Queensland Museum information about sponges
 Queensland Museum Sessile marine invertebrates collections
 Queensland Museum Sessile marine invertebrates research
 Sponge Guide for Britain and Ireland, Bernard Picton, Christine Morrow & Rob van Soest
 World Porifera database, the world list of extant sponges, includes a searchable database.
 Sponges: World production and markets // Food and Agriculture Organisation

 
Aquatic animals

Ediacaran first appearances
Parazoa